Miss Grand United States 2019 was the third edition of the Miss Grand United States pageant, held on August 11, 2019, at Lincolnshire Marriott Resort, Lake County, Illinois. Contestants from thirty-five U.S. statess competed for the title, of whom the representative of Nevada, Emily Irene Delgado, was named the winner. She then represented the United States at Miss Grand International 2019 in Venezuela on 25 October, but got a non-placement.

Results

Contestants
35 contestants competed for the national title.

References

External links

Official Website
 

United States
Recurring events established in 2016
Beauty pageants in the United States